The 12th season of the FA Women's Premier League.

National Division

Northern Division

Southern Division

1 - Barnet 2 points deducted for using ineligible player.

References
RSSSF

Eng
FA Women's National League seasons
Wom
1